International Tiger Coalition is an alliance of over forty non-governmental organizations representing over one hundred international organizations dedicated to stopping the trade of tiger parts from all sources, including those from tiger farms.

International Tiger Coalition members 

 American College of Traditional Chinese Medicine
 AMUR  
 Animal Welfare Institute  
 Animals Asia Foundation  
 Association of Zoos & Aquariums  
 Big Cat Rescue  
 Born Free Foundation 
 Born Free USA  
 British and Irish Association of Zoos & Aquariums
 Care for the Wild International
 Conservation International
 Council of Colleges of Acupuncture and Oriental Medicine
 David Shepherd Wildlife Foundation
 Education for Nature Vietnam 
 Environmental Investigation Agency 
 FREELAND
 Global Tiger Patrol 
 Humane Society International 
 Humane Society of the United States
 International Fund for Animal Welfare
 Phoenix Fund
 ProFauna Indonesia
 Save The Tiger Fund 
 Species Survival Network
 The Fund For The Tiger 
 Tigris Foundation 
 Tour Operators for Tigers 
 TRAFFIC 
 21st Century Tiger
 WildAid  
 WildCat Conservation Legal Aid Society 
 Wildlife Alliance
 Wildlife Conservation Nepal
 Wildlife Conservation Society
 Wildlife Trust of India
 Wildlife Watch Group
 World Association of Zoos & Aquariums
 World Society for the Protection of Animals
 World Wildlife Fund
 Zoological Society of London

References

Animal welfare organizations
International nongovernmental organizations
Cat conservation